David James Gorman (born 2 March 1971) is an English comedian, presenter, and writer.

Gorman began his career writing for comedy series such as The Mrs Merton Show (1993–1998) and The Fast Show (1994–1997), and later garnered acclaim for his stand-up shows, one of which earned him a nomination for a Perrier Award. He became widely known for his Are You Dave Gorman? stage show, which he debuted at the 2000 Edinburgh Fringe Festival and of which the television adaptation was broadcast as The Dave Gorman Collection in 2001.

Gorman followed Are You Dave Gorman? with several other stand-up shows or comedic concepts that were turned into television series, including Dave Gorman's Googlewhack Adventure (2003–2005), Genius (2009–2010), and Modern Life Is Goodish (2013–2017). He has also been a guest on other shows such as Have I Got News for You, Taskmaster, Go 8 Bit, They Think It's All Over, and QI.

Early life
David James Gorman was born in Stafford on 2 March 1971. He has a twin brother named Nicholas. He studied mathematics at the University of Manchester but dropped out after a year.

Career

Early work
Before his solo successes, he was in demand as a writer, having co-written three series of The Mrs Merton Show, as well as writing for many other television series in the UK, including The Fast Show. In 2003, he was listed in The Observer as one of the 50 funniest acts in British comedy. As a producer, Gorman contributed to two series featuring Jenny Eclair. He has also written for comedians Harry Hill and Steve Coogan.

Gorman's first one-man "documentary style" show was entitled Reasons to be Cheerful. Billed as "a ninety minute show based on a four-minute pop song", it was based on the song "Reasons to be Cheerful, Part 3" by Ian Dury and the Blockheads. The show examined the song's lyrics in detail, with a view to establishing whether or not each of the items listed in the song was really a reason to be cheerful. The visual aspect of the show was provided by each "reason" being illustrated by one of a collection of second-hand slides that he had accumulated for the show. The show was first performed at the 1998 Edinburgh Festival Fringe and toured theatres afterwards.

His second full-length show, Dave Gorman's Better World, was first performed in Edinburgh in 1999. For the show he wrote anonymous letters to thousands of local newspapers and asked the public to suggest ways in which one man could make the world a better place. He then attempted to carry out their suggestions in order to determine their efficacy.

Are You Dave Gorman?

Gorman shot to fame following a drunken bet with his flatmate Danny Wallace, which became the backdrop to a book, written by Gorman, and a play written by Wallace. The bet was thus: Gorman claimed that he shared the name "Dave Gorman" with the assistant manager of East Fife F.C. and that there must be "loads" of others around. The bet soon evolved into a monster as, on the way to meet Dave Gormans numbers 4 and 5, Wallace decided Gorman must meet one for every card in the deck (including the jokers).

His quest to meet this target is described, with highlights including: five people changing their names by deed poll (two of whom were women); a trip to New York that resulted in failure when he discovered the man he had gone to meet was not Dave Gorman, but B. David Gorman and therefore was ineligible; and the American journey included a meeting with an actor who had played a character called David Gorman, the validity of which is hotly contested in the book.

Dave Gorman's Important Astrology Experiment

Gorman's second television series, broadcast on BBC Two in September 2002, was entitled Dave Gorman's Important Astrology Experiment and was based upon the idea of a controlled scientific experiment, although naturally not a serious one. The series had six episodes.

The premise was that it would test whether or not astrology really worked. Over the course of 40 days, he would try to follow any instructions given to people with his star sign in a selection of horoscopes, while his "control experiment" (his fraternal twin brother, Nick) ignored them. Each would record the events of each day, and how they fared in each of three areas of life: love, health and wealth. On each episode of the show, Gorman would show footage of the amusing situations he got into by trying to follow his horoscope, and then asked a panel of "experts", agony aunt Denise Robertson (love), GMTV's Dr. Hilary Jones (health) and financial expert Alvin Hall (wealth), in the studio to assess how he had fared in the three areas. Following an audience vote, Gorman would display on a "happiness graph" the difference between how he and his twin brother had fared that week, and whether it showed that astrology had produced a positive effect, a negative effect, or no significant effect at all.

The results of the "experiment" showed that his overall happiness, love, and wealth steadily began to recede over time (especially wealth as he was forced to travel excessively). Throughout the experiment, he had numerous adventures, including travelling to New York City to meet a long lost friend and then leaving a few hours later because he was ordered to spend as much time at home as possible, sharing pizza in a park while dressed in a rubber suit, and reading an illegally acquired pornographic magazine at Sunday lunch in front of his mother.

The most notable stunt he had to perform, from episode 2, was standing in Covent Garden on one leg with his foot in a bucket of water, a tangerine in one hand and some breakfast cereal in the other (in a bowl that cost £85 from Harrods), singing the national anthem backwards and balancing three books on his head. This was taken entirely literally from a very odd horoscope by Jonathan Cainer, which Gorman deemed so implausible that he did in fact present the copy of the newspaper which published it in the studio, while noting his suspicion that perhaps the author of the horoscope found out about his experiment and was pulling a prank on him.

Gorman showed that his wealth was rapidly declining, as were happiness and love, until, on the last day, he invested the last of his money to travel to Dubai to watch a golf tournament (the Dubai Desert Classic) and bet on Ian Woosnam, a golfer that shared his birthday (and would therefore share his luck). He emptied his account to travel there and, using his lucky number of the day from each of the 40 days of his experiment to determine how much he should bet, went ahead with the plan. However, he then found out that not only was gambling illegal in the country, but also that his lucky number indicated he should bet 2,903 Dirhams, which at the time was £549. Ultimately, he borrowed the money from his mother and asked her to bet the sum on Ian Woosnam to win the match of the day, as he had been instructed by his horoscope.

With his happiness at an all-time low, love scraping the bottom, and his finances in an extremely negative position, the experts, his mother, Wallace, the crowd and Gorman himself could only hope the bet would pay off – which it ultimately did at odds long enough to place him not only back at level wealth, but supplying him with twice as much cash as he had started off with. Therefore, he "proved" that astrology works and has made him happier than the control.

Dave Gorman's Googlewhack Adventure

In 2003, Gorman toured Britain with a show entitled Dave Gorman's Googlewhack Adventure, and published a book of the same name. It is another true story. At 31 Gorman decided to give up his stupid ways, grow a beard and write a novel. As a result, he believes people took him more seriously and a new novel was commissioned. While trying to write a novel for his publisher, Random House, Gorman became obsessed with Googlewhacks when someone notified him that his site had one (Francophile Namesakes), and caused him to travel across the world finding people who had authored them (one of whom turned out to be one of the Dave Gormans he had met in his first adventure). He eventually spent his publisher's advance on the quest, without writing any of the promised novel, and had to create the Dave Gorman's Googlewhack Adventure show to pay them back.

This show was premiered at the Melbourne International Comedy Festival and then went on to sell out for a two-week run at the Sydney Opera House's Studio Theatre. It also sold out at the George Square Theatre as part of the 2003 Edinburgh Festival Fringe before embarking on a major UK tour of 75 shows in the space of three months. It won Gorman the award for Best One Person Show at the HBO U.S. Comedy Arts Festival in Aspen, Colorado, an award he had previously won for the show Are You Dave Gorman? He ended up writing a book about his Googlewhack Adventure which went on to be the Sunday Times number one best seller. During his Googlewhack adventure, Gorman had a nervous breakdown, which he discusses frankly in the show.

In 2004, a DVD of the Googlewhack Adventure was released which was filmed at Swansea Grand Theatre. In 2005, Gorman toured the U.S. and performed his Googlewhack show in several cities. While in Los Angeles, he appeared on The Tonight Show, elaborating on his travels and his quest. This tour, in which he stayed at chain motels and experienced corporate America, led him to undertake a road-trip across the U.S. in which he avoided such hotels and corporate petrol stations in favour of family-owned businesses. The road trip was documented as the book and film America Unchained.

Dave Gorman versus the Rest of the World
In 2011, Gorman published a book about his adventures in various British towns, during a period of his life when he challenged people to invite him to game-playing sessions. The book explains games of Bluke, Khet, Kubb, Smite, Settlers of Catan, Monopoly, Poker and others.

Genius

Radio series

He hosted a BBC Radio 4 show called Genius, in which members of the public submitted suggestions to make a better world. Gorman and a guest then assess the idea in order to determine whether it qualifies as "genius". One series of five episodes was broadcast between 27 October and 24 November 2005, with a CD of the first series released on 27 November 2006. The second series was broadcast between 7 September and 12 October 2006, with a CD released on 7 January 2008 and a third series between 1 October and 5 November 2007. He has made many references to disliking Darren Day in various episodes of the show.

TV series

A pilot for a television version of Genius was recorded on 23 November 2007, and a series was commissioned in the spring of 2008. The series was created by Ali Crockatt and David Scott, and is produced by Simon Nicholls.

The six-part series started on Friday 20 March, 10pm on BBC2. A second series for 2010 was commissioned by the BBC. The show broadcast its first episode on Monday 27 September 2010 at 10pm on BBC Two.

The Daily Show with Jon Stewart
On 24 April 2006, Gorman made his first appearance as a reporter (he had previously appeared as a guest on 11 December 2001 promoting Are You Dave Gorman?), in which he was credited as the show's senior new correspondent. On 27 April, he debuted as the host of the show's satirical statistical analysis piece called "Poll Smoking with Dave Gorman". He was the first Daily Show correspondent to have been born in England, and the third Daily Show correspondent to have been born outside of the United States. His most recent appearance on the show was on 5 October 2006. He has also appeared co-hosting a segment called "ConTROVersy" with the Daily Show's other English correspondent, John Oliver, in which the pair calmly and genteelly discussed former UK Prime Minister Tony Blair over tea, parodying American stereotypes of Britons.

America Unchained
Between 22 October and 5 December 2006, Gorman undertook a coast-to-coast road trip through 17 states from the west coast to east coast of the United States. A book about the trip, entitled America Unchained: A Freewheeling Roadtrip in Search of Non-Corporate USA, was released on 3 April 2008. The rationale for the trip was to discover whether it is possible to travel across the United States without ever patronising any corporate or chain-style businesses ("The Man"). Gorman ate, slept, and filled his car in restaurants, hotels, and petrol stations which were all independently owned.

America Unchained also is the name of an annual campaign spearheaded by the American Independent Business Alliance since 2004 to promote the economic, cultural, and democratic importance of independent locally owned businesses. A documentary film of the adventure was also made and was aired on the British TV channel More4 on 5 February 2008 and released on DVD on 11 February. In 2007, it won the Audience Award for Best Documentary Feature at the Austin Film Festival.

Gorman's journey started in Coronado, California, and ended in Savannah, Georgia, and he was continually challenged to find independently owned gas stations, as well as repairing the car itself – which broke down surprisingly little, considering the age and mileage (124,000 at start).

Absolute Radio
Gorman was a regular guest on The Geoff Show, having been on a guest on the show three times (and also entering a phone-in competition whilst undertaking the Important Astrology Experiment), while he also had weekly interviews on Geoff Lloyd's Hometime Show to discuss his bikeathon during his Sit Down, Pedal, Pedal, Stop and Stand Up Tour. He filled in for weekend presenter Frank Skinner for three weeks during the summer of 2009. The station subsequently announced that he would have a full-time show; his first show aired on 11 October, with Gorman joined by Danielle Ward and Martin White. White left the show in April 2012, to be replaced by Michael Legge. The show ended on 18 November 2012.

Stand-up
Gorman performed numerous times as a stand up earlier in his career. On 30 August 2009, he began a 32-date tour called Sit Down, Pedal, Pedal, Stop and Stand Up. The tour saw him covering the extremes of the British mainland as he cycled from Britain's southernmost point to its northernmost tip, taking in the most easterly and westerly points along the way and performing each night of the journey.

In 2010, Gorman performed a 37-date tour as an extension of his 2009 Sit Down, Pedal, Pedal, Stop and Stand Up Tour. About this show he said, "I won't be cycling to these. Same show, fewer blisters." On 12 July 2010, he performed the show again – twice in one evening – at the Bloomsbury Theatre in London, which was recorded for a DVD release (Dave Gorman Stand-Up. Live.). Prior to the recording, Gorman performed the act again as The Warm Up Show at four small venues in the UK in order to freshen his memory.

Modern Life Is Goodish

In September 2013, Gorman returned to television with a new show, Modern Life Is Goodish, on the Dave channel. In January 2014, the show was renewed for two additional series to follow the initial three. The fourth series commenced in November 2016. The fifth series ran from 31 October to 20 December 2017, after which Gorman confirmed that it was the final series. At its peak, the series attracted 1.5 million viewers.

With Great PowerPoint Comes Great 
On 13 November 2017, towards the end of the run of Modern Life Is Goodish,  Gorman announced a new stage show to conclude the series called With Great PowerPoint Comes Great . The show had an initial run from 6 September to 25 November 2018. Since then, Gorman has announced 19 more tour dates for January–February 2019 due to the number of tickets sold. While Dave has wished for the contents of the show to remain unspoiled for people going into the show, he has requested that people talk about the Giraffe joke, which Gorman has cited as being the best giraffe joke in the world. Due to the popularity of the show, after a short break during the filming of Terms and Conditions Apply, Dave continued to tour until November 2019.

Terms and Conditions Apply
In June 2019, it was announced on Chortle that Gorman will be hosting a new TV series on Dave called Terms and Conditions Apply. There will be eight one-hour long episodes. The format is similar to that of Modern Life Is Goodish, however Gorman shall be joined by guest stars on each episode, competing in various games based on the subjects presented. Filming for the first series took place from 2 July to 29 August 2019. It began airing on Dave in October 2019.

PowerPoint to the People
On 30 April 2022, Dave Gorman announced another live stage show tour called PowerPoint to the People for autumn 2022. It runs from 10 September to 11 November 2022. Extra dates have been added since, running from 16 March 2023 until 17 June 2023.

Other appearances
Gorman appeared in one episode of Absolutely Fabulous in 2001. He played the part of Rimmer, a photographer, in the fourth season's third episode "Paris". He also appeared for two series as one of the team captains on the BBC Three television show, Rob Brydon's Annually Retentive. The programme was a comedy about the making of a celebrity panel show hosted by Rob Brydon, and ran from 2006 to 2007. In 2006, he also became an occasional contributor on Comedy Central's The Daily Show with Jon Stewart. He has listed among his ambitions a wish to become a captain on the quiz show Call My Bluff.

Gorman appeared in two episodes of Have I Got News For You, including the famous episode broadcast in the week that news broke of host Angus Deayton's scandal involving prostitutes and the use of illegal drugs. He also appeared in an episode of the sports comedy quiz They Think It's All Over. Gorman also appeared on, and won, episode nine of the first series of QI, in which the guests included Jo Brand and Jeremy Hardy. He appeared again in 2011 in the ninth series, winning again. He appeared as a guest on the Frank Skinner show Opinionated on 23 April 2010.

In 2009, Gorman appeared in Robert Llewellyn's online programme Carpool which was broadcast on Dave, and can be viewed at Llewellyn's YouTube channel, LlewTube. He presented Bravo TV's first live PDC darts coverage alongside James Richardson during the 2010 European Championship Darts. Gorman appeared on the week-long special Grand Designs Live, in which he showcased eccentric houses in the United States in 2015.

Gorman was a regular alongside Geoff Lloyd on Virgin Radio's The Geoff Show, also appearing on the same presenter's Hometime Show. Following the rebranding of the station to Absolute Radio, Gorman joined the station as a presenter himself. He has made many appearances on Channel 5's The Wright Stuff, and has appeared on several episodes of Radio 4's Just a Minute. Gorman was also the "Curator" for John Lloyd's BBC Radio 4 series Museum of Curiosity in the fourth series, as well as standing in for Jon Richardson in one edition of the third series after the latter was left stranded due to the volcanic eruption of Eyjafjallajökull.

In October 2014, it was announced that Gorman would voice a character in the upcoming crowdfunded animated film Doug and the Meaning of Life. However, as of 2019, the domain hosting the website has been shut down, and no further updates have been posted to the Kickstarter page of the project. Only a small clip featuring Gorman's audition for his role seems to exist, via the official YouTube channel for the film.

Gorman has also provided voiceover for a television  campaign by Homebase, the UK DIY chain.

When Lee Mack appeared on a Who Wants To Be A Millionaire? celebrity special on 3 January 2012, Gorman was the 'phone-a-friend' to whom Mack turned; he successfully identified Carte Blanche as a James Bond novel, doing so without needing to be told the four possible answers.

In 2020, Gorman began setting cryptic crosswords for three British newspapers, first to The Independent under the pseudonym "Bluth" then to The Daily Telegraph under the name "Django" and to The Guardian under the name "Fed".

Personal life
Gorman and his wife, Beth, were married on 8 October 2010. They reside in Bournemouth and have a son (born 2015).

During his performance at the 2011 Edinburgh Fringe Festival, Gorman referred to himself as an "atheist from a Christian background". He has been mistakenly identified as Jewish, which once led to his inclusion in the Jewish magazine JLifestyle list of top "literary Jews" in 2008. He has also often been incorrectly described as a vegetarian when he is actually pescatarian, primarily due to his habit of simply saying he does not eat meat rather than specifying that he still eats seafood.

References

External links

Official website

1971 births
Comedians from Staffordshire
Darts people
English atheists
English male comedians
English satirists
Living people
People from Stafford
English twins
20th-century English comedians
21st-century English comedians
Crossword compilers